The Shire of East Gippsland is a local government area in Gippsland, Victoria, Australia, located in the eastern part of the state.

It includes the towns of Bairnsdale, Benambra, Bruthen, Buchan, Ensay, Lakes Entrance, Mallacoota, Metung, Omeo, Orbost, Paynesville, Swan Reach and Swifts Creek. It was formed in 1994 from the amalgamation of the City of Bairnsdale, Shire of Bairnsdale, Shire of Omeo, Shire of Orbost, Shire of Tambo and parts of the Shire of Rosedale.

The Shire is governed and administered by the East Gippsland Shire Council; its seat of local government and administrative centre is located at the council headquarters in Bairnsdale, it also has service centres located in Lakes Entrance, Omeo and Orbost. The Shire is named after the Gippsland region, in which the LGA occupies the eastern portion.

Council

Current composition
The council is composed of nine councillors elected to represent an unsubdivided municipality.

Administration and governance
The council meets in the council chambers at the council headquarters in the Bairnsdale Municipal Offices, which is also the location of the council's administrative activities. It also provides customer services at both its administrative centre in Bairnsdale, and its service centres in Lakes Entrance, Omeo and Orbost.

Townships and localities
The 2021 census, the shire had a population of 48,715 up from 45,040 in the 2016 census

^ - Territory divided with another LGA
* - Not noted in 2016 Census
# - Not noted in 2021 Census

See also
 East Gippsland
 List of localities (Victoria)

References

External links

East Gippsland Shire Council official website
Vic Govt Dept of Natural Resources and Environment: East Gippsland biodiversity management
Metlink local public transport map
Link to Land Victoria interactive maps

Local government areas of Victoria (Australia)
Gippsland (region)